Martha Nelson Thomas (born Martha Marie Nelson, November 29, 1950 – May 26, 2013) was an American folk artist, known for her work in soft sculpture. Thomas was the creator of "Doll Babies," the inspiration for Cabbage Patch Kids.

Biography
Martha Nelson was born in Princeton, Kentucky to Ralph and Ernestine Nelson. As an infant, her family moved to Mayfield, Kentucky. She graduated from the Louisville School of Art. Martha Nelson married Tucker Thomas on October 10, 1981. They had three children Seth, Carl and Mara. Martha is the sister of Louisville based stone carver Albert Nelson.

In 1971, while a student, Thomas began experimenting with soft sculpture in the form of dolls. She designed her "Doll Babies" with input from children she knew, made them by hand, and sold them at craft fairs around Louisville, Kentucky. In 1976, Thomas met Xavier Roberts at one of these craft fairs. He asked her to supply him with dolls to sell in Georgia, where he lived and worked. Thomas briefly let him sell her Doll Babies, but stopped. Roberts created his own version in 1978, and in 1982 he licensed the dolls to Coleco for mass-production under the name Cabbage Patch Kids.

In 1979, Thomas filed her first suit against Roberts. By 1983, she was seeking $1 million in damages from Roberts. In 1984, the case was settled out of court for an undisclosed amount. Around this time, while Cabbage Patch Kids were so popular that buyers had to join a nine-month waiting list, Thomas sold a line of craft items through Fibre-Craft based on her original Doll Babies that allowed buyers to sew up their own doll. Cabbage Patch Kids at this time sold for $30 to $150; Thomas's Doll Babies supplies cost about $16 total. After the court case Martha continued to create art throughout her life. Some of her projects included making toys based on her children's drawings and making toys using socks. Martha and her family sold these creations at local craft fairs. Martha was also committed to fostering a love of art in children. She was an artist in residence at her children's elementary school and did workshops with the local girl scouts and other organizations.

Thomas died in Louisville, Kentucky on May 26, 2013 after a battle with ovarian cancer.

Her work has been exhibited at the High Museum of Art.

References

Folk artists
People from Mayfield, Kentucky
American women artists
1950s births
2013 deaths
21st-century American women